Herock is a surname. Notable people with the surname include:

Ken Herock (born 1941), American football player
Shaun Herock, American football executive